Some the most influential psychoanalysts and theorists, philosophers and literary critics who were or are influenced by psychoanalysis include:

 Karl Abraham – psychoanalyst
 Nicolas Abraham – psychoanalyst
 Alfred Adler – founder of individual psychology
 Theodor Adorno – philosopher
 Salman Akhtar- psychoanalyst
 Franz Alexander – psychoanalyst
 Louis Althusser – philosopher
 Lou Andreas-Salomé – psychoanalyst
 Didier Anzieu – psychoanalyst
 Lisa Appignanesi
 Jacob Arlow
 Michael Balint – psychoanalyst
 Lee Baxandall
 Ernest Becker
 Jessica Benjamin – psychoanalyst, sociologist
 Bruno Bettelheim
 Wilfred Bion – psychoanalyst
 Harold Bloom 
 Christopher Bollas – psychoanalyst 
 John Bowlby – psychoanalyst
 Charles Brenner
 André Breton
 Abraham Brill – psychoanalyst
 Deborah Britzman 
 Norman O. Brown
 Ruth Mack Brunswick – psychoanalyst
 Judith Butler – philosopher
 Cornelius Castoriadis
 Janine Chasseguet-Smirgel – psychoanalyst
 Nancy Chodorow
 David Cooper
 Joan Copjec
 Gilles Deleuze – philosopher
 Jacques Derrida – philosopher
 Helene Deutsch – psychoanalyst
 Françoise Dolto – psychoanalyst
 Terry Eagleton
 Kurt R. Eissler – psychoanalyst
 Max Eitingon – psychoanalyst
 Erik Erikson – psychoanalyst
 Horacio Etchegoyen – psychoanalyst
 Bracha L. Ettinger
 Ronald Fairbairn – psychoanalyst
 Pierre Fédida
 Shoshana Felman
 Otto Fenichel – psychoanalyst
 Sándor Ferenczi – psychoanalyst
 John Flügel – psychoanalyst
 John Forrester
 S. H. Foulkes – psychoanalyst
 Anna Freud – psychoanalyst
 Sigmund Freud – founder of psychoanalysis
 Erich Fromm – social psychologist
 Frieda Fromm-Reichmann – psychoanalyst
 Jane Gallop

 Carol Gilligan
 Edward Glover – psychoanalyst
 André Green – psychoanalyst
 Jay Greenberg – (psychoanalyst)
 Ralph R. Greenson – psychoanalyst
 Otto Gross
 Elizabeth Grosz
 Stephen Grosz – psychoanalyst
 Félix Guattari – philosopher
 Harry Guntrip – psychoanalyst
 Jürgen Habermas – philosopher
 G. Stanley Hall – psychologist
 Heinz Hartmann – psychiatrist and psychoanalyst
 Paula Heimann – psychoanalyst
 James Hillman - founder of Archetypal Psychology
 James Hollis - psychoanalyst
 Karen Horney – psychoanalyst
 Luce Irigaray – philosopher
 Susan Sutherland Isaacs – psychoanalyst
 Edith Jacobson – psychoanalyst
 Arthur Janov
 Adrian Johnston – philosopher
 Ernest Jones – psychoanalyst
 Carl Jung – founder of analytical psychology
 Eric Kandel
 Károly Kerényi
 Otto Kernberg – psychoanalyst
 Paulina Kernberg – psychoanalyst
 Masud Khan – psychoanalyst
 Melanie Klein – psychoanalyst
 Heinz Kohut – psychoanalyst
 Joel Kovel – psychoanalyst
 Julia Kristeva – psychoanalyst and philosopher
 Jacques Lacan – psychoanalyst
 Robert Langs – psychoanalyst
 R. D. Laing
 Jean Laplanche – psychoanalyst
 Darian Leader – psychoanalyst 
 Jonathan Lear – psychoanalyst
 Claude Lévi-Strauss
 Hans Loewald – psychoanalyst
 Henry Zvi Lothane
 Alexander Lowen – psychoanalyst and psychiatrist
 Rudolf Löwenstein – psychoanalyst
 Jean-François Lyotard – philosopher
 Margaret Mahler – psychoanalyst
 Maud Mannoni – psychoanalyst
 Octave Mannoni – psychoanalyst
 Herbert Marcuse – philosopher
 Donald Meltzer – psychoanalyst
 Karl Menninger
 Adolf Meyer
 Juliet Mitchell – psychoanalyst
 Stephen A. Mitchell
 Toril Moi

 Juan-David Nasio
 Erich Neumann
 Susie Orbach – psychoanalyst
 Joy Osofsky – psychoanalyst
 Fritz Perls
 Adam Phillips – psychoanalyst
 Sandor Rado – psychoanalyst
 Otto Rank – psychoanalyst
 David Rapaport
 Wilhelm Reich – psychoanalyst
 Theodor Reik – psychoanalyst
 Laurence A. Rickels
 Paul Ricœur – philosopher
 Philip Rieff
 Joan Riviere – psychoanalyst
 Géza Róheim
 Avital Ronell
 Jacqueline Rose
 Herbert Rosenfeld – psychoanalyst
 Élisabeth Roudinesco
 Benjamin B. Rubinstein
 Jurgen Ruesch
 Hanns Sachs – psychoanalyst
 Joseph J. Sandler – psychoanalyst
 Jean-Paul Sartre – philosopher
 Nina Searl
 Harold Searles – psychoanalyst
 Hanna Segal – psychoanalyst
 Roy Schafer – psychoanalyst
 Melitta Schmideberg – psychoanalyst
 Mark Solms
 Sabina Spielrein – psychoanalyst
 René Spitz – psychoanalyst
 Hyman Spotnitz
 Martin Stanton – psychoanalyst
 John Steiner – psychoanalyst
 Wilhelm Stekel – psychoanalyst
 Daniel N. Stern
 Robert J. Stoller – psychoanalyst
 Alix Strachey – psychoanalyst
 James Strachey – psychoanalyst
 Harry Stack Sullivan – psychoanalyst
 Neville Symington – psychoanalyst
 Arthur Tansley
 Victor Tausk – psychoanalyst
 Clara Thompson – psychoanalyst
 Mária Török – psychoanalyst
 Lionel Trilling
 Frances Tustin – psychoanalyst
 Vamık Volkan – psychiatrist
 Donald Winnicott – psychoanalyst
 Robert M. Young 
 Elisabeth Young-Bruehl – psychoanalyst
 Gregory Zilboorg – psychoanalyst
 Slavoj Žižek – philosopher
 Alenka Zupančič – philosopher